Ranjit Singh (born 25 November 1957) in small village of punjab (Jindwari, district Ropar )is an Indian racewalker. He competed in the men's 20 kilometres walk at the 1980 Summer Olympics.He won silver medal in 1981 asian athletics championships held in Tokyo japan

References

External links
 

1957 births
Living people
Athletes (track and field) at the 1980 Summer Olympics
Indian male racewalkers
Olympic athletes of India
Place of birth missing (living people)